Animamundi: Dark Alchemist (アニマ・ムンディ 終わりなき闇の舞踏 Anima Mundi: Owarinaki Yami no Butou) is a Japanese gothic horror visual novel developed by Karin Entertainment and distributed by Hirameki International in the United States.

Story 

Many years have passed since Count Georik Zaberisk, once famed as the brilliant Royal Physician serving the King of Hardland, relinquished his title and moved to the country to care for his frail sister, Lillith. The King offers Georik a new position as doctor in the capital, to which he agrees. During his absence, the villagers suspect his sister of witchcraft and as a result, an angry mob storms the Zaberisk manor and Lillith is burned and beheaded. Devastated by this turn of events, Georik is overcome with grief until he discovers Lillith's severed head still lives. Once settled in the city, Georik turns to alchemy, forbidden in the kingdom of Hardland, to restore his sister's body. Treading a dark, dangerous path, Georik's research may lead him to uncover horrific truths about the Kingdom, his colleagues, and himself.

Characters 
 
 
 The protagonist. He makes a contract with the devil Mephistopheles in order to save his sister. A former royal physician and an aristocrat who must resort to the forbidden art of alchemy to restore his sister's body.

 
 
 Georik's sister. Before she was beheaded, she had an affinity for animals and collected Gothic Lolita dresses. After her beheading,  she's somehow survived.

 
 
 Hardland's greatest inventor and the Secretary of Science and Technology. As Lillith's fiancé, he is distraught upon hearing news of her death. He is a close friend of Georik.

 
 
 Another good friend of Georik; loyal and religious. He is the Captain of the Royal Guard.

 
 
 An alchemist with unsavory intentions who worships devils and yearns to contract with Mephistopheles, who has no interest in working with him. He became the royal physician after Georik quit the job.

 
 
 The Devil who forms a contract with Georik.

 
 
 A mysterious fortuneteller and spirit medium. He runs the Golden Goose shop which deals in magical tools and ingredients. He is also skilled in the art of exorcism.

 
 
 A broker who trades organs and stolen goods on the black market. He tends to pester Georik. He is also a member of The secret Hell-Fire Club.

Reception

Animamundi did not attract much attention in the mainstream gaming press due to its limited distribution. The game was positively received among indie gaming websites focused primarily on visual novels, but many fans criticized the North American release for editing or omitting in-game graphics that featured gore or soft yaoi. In response, Hirameki released limited copies of the Japanese official game book. Another source of criticism was a text error that would be activated by clicking a particular series of events in a specific order.

In its review, GrrlGamer.com noted the "beautiful artwork, great musical score composed of symphony and chorus, [and] superb voice acting," as well as the elaborate story line and dialogue. The review also complimented the English language adaptation, noting that "aside from a couple of minor typos here and there... Hirameki has truly done an outstanding professional job in this title." GamerGirlsUnite.com gave the novel an 85% rating, praised the voice acting with particular notice given to Yui Horie's performance as Lillith, and concluded that "... if you want to explore a new gaming genre, you're fond of reading stories and not afraid of getting into a gothic horror adventure, this is the game you need to experience. You won't regret it!

References

External links 
 Official page (Japanese)
 Review at Gamer Girls Unite

2004 video games
Hirameki International games
Role-playing video games
Single-player video games
Video games about alchemy
Visual novels
Windows games
Windows-only games
Yaoi video games